Brookside may refer to:

Geography

Canada
 Brookside, Edmonton
 Brookside, Newfoundland and Labrador
 Brookside, Nova Scotia

United Kingdom
Brookside, Berkshire, England
Brookside, Telford, an area of Telford, England

United States
 Brookside, Alabama
 Brookside, Los Angeles
 Brookside, Colorado
 Brookside, Delaware
 Brookside, Kansas City, a neighborhood in Kansas City, Missouri
 Brookside, Kentucky
 Brookside, New Jersey, listed on the National Register of Historic Places (NRHP) in Morris County
 Brookside, Ohio
 Brookside, Adams County, Wisconsin, an unincorporated community
 Brookside, Oconto County, Wisconsin, an unincorporated community
  Brookside, Tulsa, Oklahoma
 Brookside Gardens, public gardens located within Wheaton Regional Park, Silver Spring, Maryland
 Brookside Village, Texas
 Brookside Village, Westford, Vermont, an historic village of Westford, Vermont

Historic buildings
Brookside (Upper Nyack, New York), an historic home listed on the NRHP in Rockland County
Brookside Museum, sometimes known as the Aldridge House, in Ballston Spa, New York; listed on the NRHP in Saratoga County

People with the surname
Robbie Brookside, British professional wrestler
Xia Brookside, British professional wrestler

Other uses
Brookside (TV series), British soap opera that aired from 1982 to 2003
Brookside Capital, a former name of Bain Capital Public Equity
Brookside Dairy Limited, a dairy processing company in Kenya
Brookside Elementary School, San Anselmo, California
Brookside Chocolate, a division of Hershey Canada

See also
Brookside Park (disambiguation)